Samuel Remy (born 23 October 1973) is a former Belgian professional footballer, who last played for Wallonia Walhain.

Remy played several seasons with Charleroi at the highest level of Belgian football, featuring in 123 games and scoring 19 goals. Thereafter he mainly played for Tubize and OH Leuven in the Belgian Second Division.

References

1973 births
Living people
Belgian footballers
Belgian Pro League players
Challenger Pro League players
Racing Jet Wavre players
R. Charleroi S.C. players
SK Vorwärts Steyr players
A.F.C. Tubize players
Oud-Heverlee Leuven players

Association football midfielders
R. Wallonia Walhain Chaumont-Gistoux players